The province of North Sumatra in Indonesia is divided into regencies which in turn are divided administratively into districts.

The districts of North Sumatra with the regency it falls into are as follows:

Adiankoting, Tapanuli Utara
Adman Dewi, Tapanuli Tengah
Aek Bilah, Tapanuli Selatan
Aek Kuasan, Asahan
Aek Kuo, Labuhanbatu Utara
Aek Ledong, Asahan
Aek Natas, Labuhanbatu Utara
Aek Songsongan, Asahan
Afulu, Nias Utara
Air Batu, Asahan
Air Joman, Asahan
Air Putih, Batubara
Ajibata, Toba Samosir
Alasa Talumuzoi, Nias Utara
Alasa, Nias Utara
Amandraya, Nias Selatan
Arse, Tapanuli Selatan
Babalan, Langkat
Badiri, Tapanuli Tengah
Bahorok, Langkat
Baktiraja, Humbang Hasundutan
Balige, Toba Samosir
Bandar Huluan, Simalungun
Bandar Khalipah, Serdang Bedagai
Bandar Masilam, Simalungun
Bandar Pasir Mandoge, Asahan
Bandar Pulau, Asahan
Bandar, Simalungun
Bangun Purba, Deli Serdang
Barumun Tengah, Padang Lawas
Barumun, Padang Lawas
Barus, Tapanuli Tengah
Barusjahe, Karo
Batahan, Mandailing Natal
Batang Bulu Sutam, Padang Lawas
Batang Kuis, Deli Serdang
Batang Lubu Sutam, Padang Lawas
Batang Natal, Mandailing Natal
Batang Onang, Tapanuli Selatan
Batang Serangan, Langkat
Batang Toru, Tapanuli Selatan
Bawolato, Nias
Berampu, Dairi
Beringin, Deli Serdang
Besitang, Langkat
Bilah Barat, Labuhan Batu
Bilah Hilir, Labuhan Batu
Bilah Hulu, Labuhan Batu
Binjai, Langkat
Biru-Biru, Deli Serdang
Bor Bor, Toba Samosir
Bosar Maligas, Simalungun
Brandan Barat, Langkat
Bukit Malintang, Mandailing Natal
Buntu Pane, Asahan
Datuk Bandar, Tanjung Balai
Deli Tua, Deli Serdang
Dolat Rakyat, Karo
Dolok Batunanggar, Simalungun
Dolok Masihul, Serdang Bedagai
Dolok Merawan, Serdang Bedagai
Dolok Panribuan, Simalungun
Dolok Pardamean, Simalungun
Dolok Sanggul, Humbang Hasundutan
Dolok Sigompulon, Tapanuli Selatan
Dolok Silau, Simalungun
Dolok, Tapanuli Selatan
Galang, Deli Serdang
Garoga, Tapanuli Utara
Gebang, Langkat
Gido, Nias
Girsang Sipangan Bolon, Simalungun
Gomo, Nias Selatan
Gunung Malela, Simalungun
Gunung Maligas, Simalungun
Gunung Meriah, Deli Serdang
Gunung Sitember, Dairi
Gunung Sitoli Alo'oa, Gunung Sitoli
Gunung Sitoli Barat, Gunung Sitoli
Gunung Sitoli Idanoi, Gunung Sitoli
Gunung Sitoli Selatan, Gunung Sitoli
Gunung Sitoli Utara, Gunung Sitoli
Gunung Sitoli, Gunung Sitoli
Gunung Tua, Padang Lawas Utara
Habinsaran, Toba Samosir
Halongonan, Tapanuli Selatan
Haranggaol Horisan, Simalungun 
Harian, Samosir
Hatonduhan, Simalungun
Hibala, Nias Selatan
Hili Serangkai, Nias
Hiliduho, Nias
Hinai, Langkat
Huristak, Padang Lawas
Huta Bargot, Mandailing Natal
Huta Raja Tinggi, Padang Lawas
Hutabayu Raja, Simalungun
Idano Gawo, Nias
Jawa Maraja Bah Jambi, Simalungun
Jorlang Hataran, Simalungun
Juhar, Karo
Kabanjahe, Karo
Kampung Rakyat, Labuhanbatu Selatan
Kecamatan Sosopan
Kerajaan, Pakpak Bharat
Kisaran Barat, Asahan
Kisaran Timur, Asahan
Kolang, Tapanuli Tengah
Kota Kisaran Barat, Asahan
Kota Kisaran Timur, Asahan
Kota Pinang, Labuhanbatu Selatan
Kotanopan, Mandailing Natal
Kotarih, Serdang Bedagai
Kuala, Langkat
Kualuh Hilir, Labuhanbatu Utara
Kualuh Hulu, Labuhanbatu Utara
Kualuh Leidong, Labuhanbatu Utara
Kualuh Selatan, Labuhanbatu Utara
Kuta Buluh, Karo
Kutalimbaru, Deli Serdang
Kutambaru, Langkat
Labuhan Deli, Deli Serdang
Lae Parira, Dairi
Lagu Boti, Toba Samosir
Lahewa Timur, Nias Utara
Lahewa, Nias Utara
Lahomi, Nias Barat
Lahusa, Nias Selatan
Laubaleng, Karo
Lembah Sorik Merapi, Mandailing Natal
Limapuluh, Batubara
Lingga Bayu, Mandailing Natal
Lintong Nihuta, Humbang Hasundutan
Lolo Wa'u, Nias Selatan
Lolofitu Moi, Nias Barat
Lolomatua, Nias Selatan
Lotu, Nias Utara
Lubuk Barumun, Padang Lawas
Lubuk Pakam, Deli Serdang
Lumban Julu, Toba Samosir
Lumut, Tapanuli Tengah
Mandrehe Barat, Nias Barat
Mandrehe Utara, Nias Barat
Mandrehe, Nias Barat
Manduamas, Tapanuli Tengah
Marancar, Tapanuli Selatan
Marbau, Labuhanbatu Utara
Mardingding, Karo
Medang Deras, Batubara
Meranti, Asahan
Merdeka, Karo
Merek, Karo
Moro'o, Nias Barat
Muara Batang Gadis, Mandailing Natal
Muara Sipongi, Mandailing Natal
Muara, Tapanuli Utara
Munthe, Karo
Na IX-X, Labuhanbatu Utara
Naga Juang, Mandailing Natal
Nainggolan, Samosir
Naman Teran, Karo
Namo Rambe, Deli Serdang
Namohalu Esiwa, Nias Utara
Natal, Mandailing Natal
Onan Ganjang, Humbang Hasundutan
Onan Runggu, Samosir
Padang Bolak Julu, Tapanuli Selatan
Padang Bolak, Tapanuli Selatan
Padang Hilir, Tebing Tinggi
Padang Hulu, Tebing Tinggi
Padang Sidempuan Barat, Tapanuli Selatan
Padang Sidempuan Batu Nadua, Padang Sidempuan
Padang Sidempuan Hutaimbaru, Padang Sidempuan
Padang Sidempuan Selatan, Padang Sidempuan
Padang Sidempuan Tenggara, Padang Sidempuan
Padang Sidempuan Timur, Tapanuli Selatan
Padang Sidempuan Utara, Padang Sidempuan
Padang Tualang, Langkat
Pagar Marbau, Deli Serdang
Pagaran, Tapanuli Utara
Pagindar, Pakpak Bharat
Pahae Jae, Tapanuli Utara
Pahae Julu, Tapanuli Utara
Pakantan, Mandailing Natal
Palipi, Samosir
Panai Hilir, Labuhan Batu
Panai Hulu, Labuhan Batu
Panai Tengah, Labuhan Batu
Pancur Batu, Deli Serdang
Pane, Simalungun
Pangaribuan, Tapanuli Utara
Pangkalan Susu, Langkat
Pangkatan, Labuhan Batu
Pangururan, Samosir
Panombeian Pane, Simalungun
Pantai Cermin, Serdang Bedagai
Pantai Labu, Deli Serdang
Panyabungan Barat, Mandailing Natal
Panyabungan Kota, Mandailing Natal
Panyabungan Selatan, Mandailing Natal
Panyabungan Timur, Mandailing Natal
Panyabungan Utara, Mandailing Natal
Paranginan, Humbang Hasundutan
Parbuluan, Dairi
Parlilitan, Humbang Hasundutan
Parmonangan, Tapanuli Utara
Payung, Karo
Pegagan Hilir, Dairi
Pematang Bandar, Simalungun
Pematang Jaya, Langkat
Pematang Sidamanik, Simalungun
Percut Sei Tuan, Deli Serdang
Pergetteng-getteng Sengkut, Pakpak Bharat
Petumbak, Deli Serdang
Pintu Pohan Meranti, Toba Samosir
Pollung, Humbang Hasundutan
Porsea, Toba Samosir
Portibi, Tapanuli Selatan
Pulau Rakyat, Asahan
Pulau-Pulau Batu, Nias Selatan
Pulo Bandring, Asahan
Puncak Sorik Merapi, Mandailing Natal
Purba, Simalungun
Purbatua, Tapanuli Utara
Rahuning, Asahan
Rambutan, Tebing Tinggi
Rantau Selatan, Labuhan Batu
Rantau Utara, Labuhan Batu
Ranto Baek, Mandailing Natal
Rawang Panca Arga, Asahan
Raya Kahean, Simalungun
Raya, Simalungun
Ronggur Nihuta, Samosir
S. Tualang Raso, Tanjung Balai
Saipar Dolok Hole, Tapanuli Selatan
Salak, Pakpak Bharat
Salapian, Langkat
Sawit Seberang, Langkat
Sawo, Nias Utara
Sayur Matinggi, Tapanuli Selatan
Secanggang, Langkat
Sei Balai, Batubara
Sei Bingei, Langkat
Sei Dadap, Asahan
Sei Kanan, Labuhanbatu Selatan
Sei Kepayang Barat, Asahan
Sei Kepayang Timur, Asahan
Sei Kepayang, Asahan
Sei Lepan, Langkat
Sei Rampah, Serdang Bedagai
Sei Suka, Batubara
Selesai, Langkat
Setia Janji, Asahan
Siabu, Mandailing Natal
Siais, Tapanuli Selatan
Sianjur Mula Mula, Samosir
Siantar Barat, Pematangsiantar
Siantar Marihat, Pematangsiantar
Siantar Martoba, Pematangsiantar
Siantar Selatan, Pematangsiantar
Siantar Timur, Pematangsiantar
Siantar Utara, Pematangsiantar
Siantar, Simalungun
Siatas Barita, Tapanuli Utara
Sibabangun, Tapanuli Tengah
Sibolangit, Deli Serdang
Sibolga Kota, Sibolga
Sibolga Sambas, Sibolga
Sibolga Selatan, Sibolga
Sibolga Utara, Sibolga
Sibolga, Tapanuli Tengah
Siborong-Borong, Tapanuli Utara
Sibuhuan, Padang Lawas
Sidamanik, Simalungun
Sidikalang, Dairi
Siempat Nempu Hilir, Dairi
Siempat Nempu Hulu, Dairi
Siempat Nempu, Dairi
Siempat Rube, Pakpak Bharat
Sijama Polang, Humbang Hasundutan
Silaen, Toba Samosir
Silangkitang, Labuhanbatu Selatan
Silau Kahean, Simalungun
Silau Laut, Asahan
Silima Pungga-Pungga, Dairi
Silimakuta, Simalungun
Simangambat, Tapanuli Selatan
Simangumban, Tapanuli Utara
Simanindo, Samosir
Simpang Empat, Asahan
Simpang Empat, Karo
Sinembah Tanjungmuda Hilir, Deli Serdang
Sinembah Tanjungmuda Hulu, Deli Serdang
Sinunukan, Mandailing Natal
Sipahutar, Tapanuli Utara
Sipirok, Tapanuli Selatan
Sipispis, Serdang Bedagai
Sipoholon, Tapanuli Utara
Sirandorung, Tapanuli Tengah
Sirapit, Langkat
Sirombu, Nias Barat
Sitahuis, Tapanuli Tengah
Sitellu Tali Urang Jehe, Pakpak Bharat
Sitellu Tali Urang Julu, Pakpak Bharat
Sitiotio, Samosir
Sitolu Ori, Nias Utara
Sorkam Barat, Tapanuli Tengah
Sorkam, Tapanuli Tengah
Sosa, Padang Lawas
Sosor Gadong, Tapanuli Tengah
Stabat, Langkat
Sumbul, Dairi
Sunggal, Deli Serdang
Talawi, Batubara
Tambangan, Mandailing Natal
Tanah Jawa, Simalungun
Tanah Pinem, Dairi
Tanjung Balai Selatan, Tanjung Balai
Tanjung Balai Utara, Tanjung Balai
Tanjung Balai, Asahan
Tanjung Beringin, Serdang Bedagai
Tanjung Morawa, Deli Serdang
Tanjung Pura, Langkat
Tanjung Tiram, Batubara
Tapian Dolok, Simalungun
Tapian Nauli, Tapanuli Tengah
Tarabintang, Humbang Hasundutan
Tebingtinggi, Serdang Bedagai
Teluk Dalam, Asahan
Teluk Dalam, Nias Selatan
Teluk Mengkudu, Serdang Bedagai
Teluk Nibung, Tanjung Balai
Tiga Binanga, Karo
Tiga Lingga, Dairi
Tiga Panah, Karo
Tiganderket, Karo
Tinada, Pakpak Bharat
Tinggi Raja, Asahan
Torgamba, Labuhanbatu Selatan
Tugala Oyo, Nias Utara
Tuhemberua, Nias Utara
Tukka, Tapanuli Tengah
Ujung Padang, Simalungun
Ulu Barumun, Padang Lawas
Ulu Moro'o, Nias Barat
Ulu Pungkut, Mandailing Natal
Uluan, Toba Samosir
Wampu, Langkat

 
North Sumatra